Watchman Peak is located on the border of Alberta and British Columbia, on southern side of Thompson Pass. It was named in 1902 by James Outram.

See also
 List of peaks on the British Columbia–Alberta border

References

Watchman Peak
Watchman Peak
Canadian Rockies